The Essential Willie Nelson is a two-disc compilation of Willie Nelson songs. This digitally remastered compilation covers five decades of Nelson's recording career, and is part of Sony's Essential series of compilation albums. A 2009 release in limited Essential 3.0 series came with a bonus disc of eight fan-favourites and rarities. The album was re-released with an updated track listing on October 16, 2015.

Reception

David Quantick of Q wrote, "[T]he songs here sound fresh and almost youthful. The arrangements are sparky, too... All the sheer scope of Nelson's writing is displayed." In a retrospective review, AllMusic editor Stephen Thomas Erlewine said that "The Essential Willie Nelson gets about as close as a set could to providing the basics".

Track listing

Charts

Weekly charts

Year-end charts

Certifications

References

Sony BMG compilation albums
2003 compilation albums
Willie Nelson compilation albums